Rajiv Gandhi National University of Law (RGNUL), is a public law school and a National Law University located in Patiala, Punjab, India. It was established in 2006 by the Punjab Government (Punjab Act No. 12 of 2006) as a university dedicated to the field of Legal Education. The first vice-chancellor of the University was Gurjit Singh. The institution is currently being headed by  Prof.(Dr.) G.S. Bajpai. RGNUL started functioning from its Headquarters-Mohindra Kothi, The Mall, Patiala w.e.f. 26 May 2006. From session of 2013 RGNUL started functioning in its permanent  campus which is located at scenic Sidhuwal,  from Patiala. RGNUL is affiliated to UGC and approved by the Bar Council of India. It is one of the autonomous law schools in India.

RGNUL campus is situated near Village Sidhuwal, Bhadson Road, Patiala and has an area of approximately 50 acres.

Academics 
RGNUL offers a 5-year B.A. LL.B (Honours) programme and a 1-year LL.M. with an intake of 196 seats per annum and 60 seats per annum, respectively. Admission to these programmes is through Common Law Admission Test (CLAT). Ph.D programmes are also offered.

Rankings

The National Institutional Ranking Framework (NIRF) ranked Rajiv Gandhi National University of Law 10 among law colleges in 2021.

See also
 Legal education in India

References

External links

Universities in Punjab, India
Law schools in Punjab, India
Education in Patiala
National Law Universities
2006 establishments in Punjab, India
Educational institutions established in 2006